Stanisław Adamski (12 April 1875 – 12 November 1967) was a Polish bishop, politician, and social and political activist of the Union of Catholic Societies of Polish Workers (Związek Katolickich Towarzystw Robotników Polskich), founder and editor of the 'Robotnik' (Worker) weekly.

Adamski was born in Zielonagóra.  He was a Sejm deputy (1919–1922) and senator (1922–1927).

During World War II, Germans prevented him from carrying out his duties (1940–1945). Later, he was repressed by the communist government, removed from office in 1952, and upon being allowed in 1956, due to old age, delegated the responsibility to others.  He died in Katowice.

References
 Witold Jakóbczyk, Przetrwać na Wartą 1815-1914, Dzieje narodu i państwa polskiego, vol. III-55, Krajowa Agencja Wydawnicza, Warszawa 1989

1875 births
1967 deaths
People from Szamotuły County
People from the Province of Posen
Polish Roman Catholic bishops
Members of the Legislative Sejm of the Second Polish Republic
Senators of the Second Polish Republic (1922–1927)
Diplomats of the Second Polish Republic
Polish cooperative organizers
Polish people of World War II